Maksut "Maksa" Ćatović (born 9 October 1950) is a Serbian film producer and former president of production company Komuna.

Biography 
He was born in Novi Pazar, Serbia. From 1985 Ćatović was the owner and CEO of Komuna, working for films including Underground Golden Palm winner (1995) and Black Cat, White Cat Silver Lion winner in Venice (2008).

Ćatović worked as a concert organizer and promoter for Luciano Pavarotti, Madonna, AC/DC, Sting, Metallica, R.E.M, Jethro Tull among many others bands that were playing in Serbia and Montenegro.

Selected filmography

Producer

Films
 Dara iz Jasenovca (Dara Of Jasenovac) (2020) by Predrag Antonijevic * Dara of Jasenovac
 Ubice mog oca (2017 - 2021)
 Državni službenik (2018 - 2012)
 Soldier's Lullaby (2018)
 Letete S Rossinant (2007) by Georgi Stoev
 Balkanska Braca (2005) by Boža Nikolić
 The Red Colored Gray Truck (2004) by Srdjan Koljevic
 Margina (2003) by Andrej Aćin
 The State Of The Dead (2002) by Živojin Pavlović
 Normalni Ljudi (2001) by Oleg Novkovic
 Tajna Porodicnog Blaga (2000) by Aleksandar Djordjevic
 Lajanje Na Zvezde (1998) by Zdravko Sotra
 Black Cat, White Cat (1998) by Emir Kusturica
 My Country (1997) by Milos Radovic
 Underground (1995) by Emir Kusturica
 Pjevam Danju, Pjevam Nocu (1978) by Jovan Ristic

TV Series
 Drzavni sluzbenik Ubice mog oca (2) (2018)
 Stizu Dolari Porodicno Blago Neki novi klinci Lisice Svastara Duska Radovica''

References

External links 

 
 komuna.com

Living people
Serbian film producers
1950 births
Film people from Belgrade